Gladbach Abbey was a Benedictine abbey founded in 974 by Archbishop Gero of Cologne and the monk Sandrad from Trier. It was named after the Gladbach, a narrow brook that now runs underground. The abbey and its adjoining villages grew into the town of Gladbach, incorporated in the 1360s, the origin of the present city of Mönchengladbach in North Rhine-Westphalia.

In 1802 the abbey was occupied by troops under the French occupation and secularised; its great library was dispersed. From 1805 to 1835 it was used as a textile mill.

In 1835 the city authorities acquired the main building to replace the old Rathaus, which was demolished. This now constitutes the present Rathaus Abtei. The remaining monastic buildings were also acquired by the city one by one, for the accommodation of municipal offices.

References 

974 establishments
Christian monasteries established in the 10th century
Benedictine monasteries in Germany
Monasteries in North Rhine-Westphalia
Buildings and structures in Mönchengladbach
10th-century establishments in Germany